The women's 100 metres hurdles event at the 1995 Summer Universiade was held on 1–2 September at the Hakatanomori Athletic Stadium in Fukuoka, Japan.

Medalists

Results

Heats
Qualification: First 2 of each heat (Q) and the next 2 fastest (q) qualified for the final.

Wind:Heat 1: +0.2 m/s, Heat 2: +0.8 m/s, Heat 3: -0.5 m/s

Final
Wind: +0.6 m/s

References

Athletics at the 1995 Summer Universiade
1995 in women's athletics
1995